Claudio Torrejón Tineo (born May 14, 1993) is an American soccer player who plays for Sport Boys as a midfielder.

Career
Torrejón left FC Banants following their last game before the winter break, in December 2016.

On January 9, 2019, Torrejón joined Sport Huancayo.

Career statistics

Club

References

1993 births
Living people
Footballers from Lima
Association football midfielders
Peruvian footballers
Sporting Cristal footballers
Club Deportivo Universidad de San Martín de Porres players
Armenian Premier League players
Ulisses FC players
FC Urartu players
Uruguayan Primera División players
Centro Atlético Fénix players
Segunda División B players
Sport Huancayo footballers
Sport Boys footballers
Peruvian Primera División players
Peruvian expatriate footballers
Peruvian expatriate sportspeople in Uruguay
Peruvian expatriate sportspeople in Spain
Expatriate footballers in Armenia
Expatriate footballers in Uruguay
Expatriate footballers in Spain